Bernal is a Spanish given name and surname, equivalent to the English name Bernard.

Bernal may refer to:

People with the name

Given name
Bernal de Bonaval, 13th century Galician troubadour
Bernal de Foix, 1st Count of Medinaceli, Spanish military officer
Bernal Díaz del Castillo (c. 1492 – 1581), Spanish conquistador

Middle name
Ralph Bernal Osborne (1808–1882), British Liberal politician

Surname

A
Agostino Bernal, Spanish Jesuit theologian
Agustín Bernal, Mexican film actor
Alejandro Bernal, Colombian football player
Andy Bernal, Australian football player

C
Cassie Bernall (1981–1999), student killed in the Columbine High School massacre
César Bernal (born 1995), Mexican footballer
Chesús Bernal (1960–2019), Spanish professor and politician

D
Darío Yazbek Bernal (1990), Mexican actor
David "Elsewhere" Bernal (1979), American popping dancer
Delfina Bernal (born 1941), Colombian painter and multimedia artist
Diana Bernal, Mexican politician

E
Egan Bernal, Colombian road cyclist

G
Gabriel Bernal, Mexican boxer
Gael García Bernal (born 1978), Mexican film actor

H
Heraclio Bernal, Mexican bandit

I
Ignacio Bernal (1910–1992), Mexican anthropologist and archaeologist
Ishmael Bernal (1938–1996), Filipino filmmaker

J
Jair Bernal (born 1968), Colombian road cyclist
Jesús Aparicio-Bernal, Spanish politician
Jesús Mosquera Bernal, Spanish actor
John Desmond Bernal (1901–1971), Irish-born biophysicist, crystallographer, historian of science, and British Communist
Jorge Bernal, Mexican football player
José Bernal (1925–2010), Cuban-American artist
José Daniel Bernal (born 1973), Colombian road cyclist
José León Bernal (born 1995), Spanish football player
Joyce E. Bernal, Filipina director
Juan Bernal Ponce, Costa Rican architect
Julio Ernesto Bernal, Colombian road cyclist

K
Kris Bernal, Filipina actress

L
Laura Bernal (195?–2020), Argentine diplomat
Lorena Bernal, Argentinian-Spanish beauty queen and actress
Lorenzo Bernal del Mercado, Spanish captain
Luz Marina Bernal (born 1960), Colombian human rights activist

M
Marcelino Bernal, Mexican football player
Martin Bernal (1937–2013), British scholar of modern Chinese political history
Miguel Bernal Jiménez (1910–1956), Mexican composer, organist, pedagogist and musicologist

P
Paulino Bernal, American accordion player

R
Ralph Bernal, British Whig politician
Rodrigo Bernal (born 1959), Colombian botanist
Rogelio Bernal Andreo (born 1969), Spanish-American astrophotographer

S
Sergio Bernal, Mexican football player
Susan Bernal, Colombian materials scientist

V
Victor Bernal, Major League Baseball pitcher

Geography
Peña de Bernal, monolith in Mexico
Bernal, Querétaro, Mexico (San Sebastián Bernal), site of the Peña de Bernal
Bernal, Argentina
Bernal, New Mexico, United States
Bernal, a location in Serafina, New Mexico, United States
Bernal Heights, neighborhood of San Francisco, United States
 Bernal Heights Summit, a nearby hill
Bernal District, Peru
Bernal Islands, sub-group of the Biscoe Islands, Antarctica
Bernal/Singleton Transfer Location, bus station in Dallas, Texas. United States
Bernal Subbasin, an aquifer in California, United States
Augustin Bernal Park, a park in Pleasanton, California, United States

Other
Bernal Lecture (endowed by John Desmond Bernal), organised by the Royal Society of London
Bernal sphere (named after John Desmond Bernal), a type of space habitat
Bernal v. Fainter, 1984 US Supreme Court case

See also
Bernalillo

Sephardic surnames